A by-election for the seat of Arafura in the Northern Territory Legislative Assembly was held on 7 November 1992. The by-election was triggered by the death of Labor (ALP) member Stan Tipiloura, who had held the seat since 1987.

The ALP selected Maurice Rioli, a former professional Australian Rules player, as its candidate. The CLP candidate was Bernard Tipiloura, with an independent candidacy of Colin Newton.

Results

 Preferences were not distributed.

References

2003 elections in Australia
Northern Territory by-elections
2000s in the Northern Territory